Cal Lane (born 1968) is a Canadian sculptor, known for creating delicate, lacy sculptures out of industrial steel products.

Early life and education
Lane was born in Halifax, Nova Scotia in 1968 and raised on Vancouver Island, where she trained as a hairdresser and a welder. She has a bachelor's degree from the Nova Scotia College of Art and Design and a Master of Fine Arts from the State University of New York at Purchase.

Art
Cal Lane uses a plasma cutter or an oxy-acetylene torch to cut intricate patterns into industrial steel products.

Lane's work is often described in terms of dichotomy or contrast. Fred A. Bernstein wrote in The New York Times: "The work is about the contrasts between the industrial and the fanciful, the opaque and the transparent." Writing for Sculpture magazine, Robin Peck said: "The dialectic is obvious: industrial versus domestic, strong versus delicate, masculine versus feminine, functional versus decorative." Lori Zimmer wrote: "Lane enjoys pushing the dichotomy of feminine and masculine by combining patterns of domesticity with these cold, harsh symbols of masculine blue collar labor."

Exhibitions
2004 Dirt Lace, Wynick/Tuck Gallery
2007 Radical Lace & Subversive Knitting Museum of Arts and Design
2008 DeCordova Museum and Sculpture Park
2010 Sweet Crude, Art Gallery of Mississauga; Southern Alberta Art Gallery
2015 Veiled Hoods and Stains, Yukon Arts Centre
2016 Sharjah Art Museum

Awards
2001 International Sculpture Center's Outstanding Student Achievement in Contemporary Sculpture
2006 Socrates Sculpture Park Fellowship
2007 Joseph S. Stauffer Prize

References

External links
Official website

Living people
1968 births
21st-century Canadian women artists
21st-century Canadian sculptors
Artists from Nova Scotia
Canadian women sculptors
NSCAD University alumni
People from Halifax, Nova Scotia
State University of New York at Purchase alumni
Welders